John Costigan (February 1, 1835 – September 29, 1916) was a Canadian judge and politician who served in the House of Commons of Canada and in the Cabinet of several Prime Ministers of Canada.

Costigan was born on February 1, 1835, in Saint-Nicolas, Lower Canada, the son of Irish immigrants John Costigan and Bridget Dunn.  He was educated at Collège de Sainte-Anne-de-la-Pocatière in Lower Canada from 1850 to 1852. In 1857, he became registrar of deeds and wills for Victoria County in New Brunswick and a judge of the Inferior Court of Common Pleas. He resigned from these posts in 1861 when he was elected to be a member of the 19th New Brunswick Legislative Assembly, representing the electoral district of Victoria.

On September 20, 1867, he was elected to the 1st Canadian Parliament as a member of the Liberal-Conservative Party by the riding of Victoria in New Brunswick. He was re-elected nine times, and he became a member of the Liberal Party on February 6, 1906. During his time as a Member of Parliament, he was a Minister of Inland Revenue, a Secretary of State of Canada, a Minister of Marine and Fisheries, and an acting Minister of Trade and Commerce.  He was Dean of the House from 1896 to 1907.

On January 15, 1907, he was appointed a member of the Senate of Canada for the senatorial division of Victoria, New Brunswick. He died in office on September 29, 1916, in Ottawa. He was interred in Grand Falls.

Mount Costigan in Banff National Park is named in his honor.

There is a John Costigan fonds at Library and Archives Canada.

Notes

References

External links
 

1835 births
1916 deaths
Canadian senators from New Brunswick
Liberal Party of Canada MPs
Liberal Party of Canada senators
Members of the House of Commons of Canada from New Brunswick
Conservative Party of Canada (1867–1942) MPs
Colony of New Brunswick judges